Cornudella de Montsant is a municipality in the comarca of the Priorat in 
Catalonia, Spain. It is situated in the north-west of the comarca below the Montsant range and the 
Prades Mountains. The Siurana reservoir is on the territory of the municipality and supplies its drinking water.

Sites near to the village include the Sant Joan del Codolar Hermitage. The village derives income from tourism and agriculture, particularly wine and hazelnuts.  Cornudella de Montsant is at the centre of one of the world's major rock climbing regions.

History
In medieval times the town was part of the Barony of Entença.

The old winery of Cornudella de Montsant, also known in Catalonia as one of the 'Wine Cathedrals, was built during the Modernisme and Noucentisme periods and was designed by architect Cèsar Martinell.

References

 Panareda Clopés, Josep Maria; Rios Calvet, Jaume; Rabella Vives, Josep Maria (1989). Guia de Catalunya, Barcelona: Caixa de Catalunya.  (Spanish).  (Catalan).

External links
Official website 
 Government data pages 

Municipalities in Priorat
Populated places in Priorat